Richard Marz (born April 30, 1944 in Three Hills, Alberta) is a Canadian politician who was the Member of the Legislative Assembly of Alberta representing the constituency of Olds-Didsbury-Three Hills as a Progressive Conservative.

Early life

Marz was born and raised in Three Hills, Alberta. After high school, he worked in the oil patch and briefly joined the Calgary Police Service. Since 1966, he has operated a farm in the Three Hills area.

Political career

Before entering provincial politics, Marz was active in municipal politics. He was elected as councillor in the municipal district of Kneehill in 1980. Marz served as a councillor for 17 years, including six years as deputy reeve and seven years as reeve. During this period, Marz was a founding member of the Provincial Health Council and a chair of the Central Alberta Association of Municipal Districts and Counties. He has served as a board member for the Didsbury General and Auxiliary Hospital and Three Hills Health Care Centre.

During his third term, Marz was elected Deputy Speaker and Chair of Committees. He chaired numerous committees since taking office in 1997, including the Standing Committee on Community Services, the Employability Council, the Farm Assessment and Taxation Committee, and the Labour Relations Code Review Committee.

Marz was elected to his fourth term representing the constituency of Olds-Didsbury-Three Hills in the 2008 provincial election, receiving 64 per cent of the vote. During that term he served as deputy chair of the Select Special Ethics Commissioner Search Committee, and sat on the Cabinet Policy Committee on the Economy; the Agenda and Priorities Committee; the Legislative Offices Committee; the Privileges and Elections, Standing Orders and Printing Committee; and the Standing Committee on the Economy.

Personal life

Marz lives on a farm near Three Hills with his wife, Janis. The couple has two adult children, LaVonne and Rick, and four grandchildren.

He has been involved in the Disabled Transportation Society, the Three Hills and District Seed Plant, the Trochu Gun Club and the Three Hills Rodeo Committee.

Election results

References

1944 births
Progressive Conservative Association of Alberta MLAs
Living people
21st-century Canadian politicians